Hugh McNeil (born 1902) was a Scottish footballer who played as a centre half or right half for Hamilton Academical and Motherwell. He was still featuring fairly regularly for the Steelmen (11 league appearances in the 1929–30 season)  when he emigrated to Nigeria to work in the oil industry, having obtained a university degree.

His father of the same name was also a footballer who too played for Motherwell and Hamilton in the same position.

References

1902 births
Year of death unknown
20th-century deaths
Scottish footballers
Footballers from Motherwell
Scottish Junior Football Association players
Association football central defenders
Association football wing halves
Larkhall Thistle F.C. players
Hamilton Academical F.C. players
Motherwell F.C. players
British emigrants to Nigeria
Scottish Football League players